The Ministry of Foreign Affairs & International Cooperation is the ministry responsible for handling the Republic of Fiji's external relations. The ministry's current director is the Minister of Foreign Affairs and International Cooperation,         Sitiveni Rabuka, who took the position in December 2022.

The ministry states that its objective is "the provision of policy advice to the Government [of Fiji] regarding the formulation and implementation of its foreign policies," and it maintains the country's various diplomatic missions based domestically in Suva, those attributed to Fiji in Canberra, Australia and Wellington, New Zealand, as well as those based internationally.

See also
 Foreign relations of Fiji
 List of diplomatic missions of Fiji

References

External links
 Official Ministry website

Government of Fiji
Foreign relations of Fiji
Fiji
Government ministries of Fiji